These are the official results of the Men's 20 kilometres race walk event at the 1983 World Championships in Helsinki, Finland. The race was held on 7 August 1983.

Medalists

Abbreviations
All times shown are in hours:minutes:seconds

Records

Intermediates

Final ranking

See also
 1980 Men's Olympic 20km Walk (Moscow)
 1982 Men's European Championships 20km Walk (Athens)
 1983 Race Walking Year Ranking
 1984 Men's Olympic 20km Walk (Los Angeles)
 1984 Men's Friendship Games 20km Walk (Moscow)
 1986 Men's European Championships 20km Walk (Stuttgart)
 1988 Men's Olympic 20km Walk (Seoul)

References
 Results
 Leichtathletik-Statistiek-Seite

W
Racewalking at the World Athletics Championships